VOGL is a debugger for the OpenGL rendering API intended to be used in the development of video games. VOGL was originally written at RAD Game Tools and Valve. VOGL is free and open-source software subject to the terms of the MIT License.

Description
There is a graphical front-end implementing Qt5-based GUI widgets.

VOGL was initially released with support for Linux operating systems only, but on April 23, 2014, additional support for Microsoft Windows was released.

Goals included:
 Free and open-source
 Steam integration
 Vendor and driver version neutral
 No special app builds needed
 Frame capturing, full stream tracing, trace trimming
 Optimized replayer
 OpenGL usage validation
 Regression testing, benchmarking
 Robust API support: OpenGL v3/4.x, core or compatibility contexts
 UI to edit captures, inspect state, diff snapshots, control tracing

VOGLperf is a benchmarking tool for Linux OpenGL games.

See also

 GLAVE (software)
 Valgrind
 Linux gaming

References

External links
 vogl's GitHub repository
 Moving Your Games to OpenGL From 33:47 till the end of the video there is an introduction to VOGL
 Moving Your Games to OpenGL Steam Dev Days 2014 Presentation PDF

Debuggers
Free software
Free software programmed in C++
Software that uses Qt
Valve Corporation
Video game development software for Linux